The Weatherhead School of Management is a private business school of Case Western Reserve University located in Cleveland, Ohio. Weatherhead offers programs concentrated in sustainability, design innovation, healthcare, organizational behavior, global entrepreneurship, and executive education. The school is named for benefactor and Weatherchem owner Albert J. Weatherhead III, and its principal facility is the Peter B. Lewis Building.

History

In 1952, Western Reserve University established the School of Business by combining the Cleveland College Division of Business Administration and the Graduate School Division of Business Administration. From its founding until 1988, the activities of the School of Business were divided among a number of buildings in downtown Cleveland and in University Circle. In 1967, the merger of Case Institute of Technology and Western Reserve University created Case Western Reserve University, and the Western Reserve University School of Business absorbed Case’s Division of Organizational Sciences to become the School of Management in 1970. In 1976, the school launched its first full-time MBA.

In 1980, the School of Management was renamed in honor of Albert J. Weatherhead, III, a Cleveland businessman and industrialist, following his $3 million gift to the school. In 1988, space on the Case Quad within what is now known as Nord Hall, then Enterprise Hall, was specially converted to house the growing Business Management program. This was made possible by funding from five leading Cleveland companies: Ohio Mattress, Nesco, Premier Industries, Parker Hannifin, and Keithley Industries.

In 2002 the new Peter B. Lewis Building was completed to house the management school. It was designed by internationally known architect Frank Gehry. The School of Management has about 1600 students annually.

Campus

The Weatherhead School of Management is housed in the Peter B. Lewis Building, located at the corner of Bellflower Road and Ford Drive. It is named after Cleveland philanthropist Peter B. Lewis, who donated $36.9 million towards its construction. The building's decentralized design was chosen so that, “Faculty offices, classrooms and meeting areas are distributed on every floor to encourage informal interaction and complement the Weatherhead School’s learner-centered curricula.”

The Center for Business as an Agent of World Benefit
The Center was launched on June 24, 2004. 

Much of the Center’s effort in all three action domains – research, pedagogy, and outreach – were manifested in 2006 at the Global Forum for Business as an Agent of World Benefit convened by the Case Weatherhead School of Management, the Academy of Management, and the United Nations Global Compact. The Forum attracted more than 400 leading scholars and business leaders from 40 countries; another 600 participated virtually. The Center created new partners for the school, including Toyota, Coca-Cola, Novartis, Lafarge, Sherwin Williams, Green Mountain Coffee Roasters, and others.

Academic programs

Undergraduate
Weatherhead offers traditional four-year programs in the following areas:
BS in Accounting - For students pursuing the BS in accounting, integrated study options enable attainment of a Master's of Accountancy degree in five years or less, satisfying the 150-hour requirement to sit for the CPA examination in most states.
BS in Management (with majors in either Finance or Marketing)
BA in Economics

All students in the undergraduate program are able to pursue minors in accounting, economics, entrepreneurship, finance, leadership, or marketing. Students pursuing a degree in engineering can partake in a specialized sequence offered by Weatherhead.  Engineering students can pursue a minor in economics or management, and sequences in economics and management/entrepreneurship.

MBA

Full-time/Traditional: A traditional 2-year program with a variety of electives and experiential learning opportunities. 
Global MBA: A full-time MBA program in which students study for a semester each in China, India, and the United States (Cleveland, Ohio).
Part-time: A 3-year program that offers the same business concepts of the full-time MBA program. Designed to meet the time constraints of employed students.
Executive MBA: Participants in the EMBA program arrive with an average of 15 years of professional experience and aim to ascend to senior leadership roles.

Dual Degrees:

In late 2008, Weatherhead consolidated many of its programs under two separate but interdisciplinary core initiatives.

Weatherhead’s joint degree programs offer a complementary education strategy to enable connections between the MBA program and a specific industry career concentration. Programs available include:
MBA/JD (Juris Doctor)
MBA/MSSA (Master of Science in Social Administration)
MBA/MAcc (Master in Accounting)
MBA/MD (Medical Doctorate)
MBA/MIM (Master in International Management)
MBA/MSN (Master of Science in Nursing)
MBA/MPH (Master of Public Health)
MBA/MSM - Operations Research
MBA/MSM - Supply Chain Management
MBA/MGM (Master in Global Management)
MBA/MS-Medical Physiology
MBA/MS-Biochemistry

Dual Degree Collaboration:
MSM-Finance and Tongji MBA Dual-Degree Program

Specialty Masters

Master of Accountancy (MAcc)

The MAcc program   features a 30-credit hour curriculum. The Weatherhead MAcc degree requirements satisfy the educational qualifications for an individual to sit for the CPA examination in the state of Ohio. A joint MAcc/MBA program is also available for students, which can be completed in two additional semesters.

Master of Supply Chain Management (MSCM)

The 30-credit-hour MSCM program is a two-semester, full-time program beginning in the fall semester of each year and can be completed in as little as nine months.  Students can extend their time in the program for up to two years with add-on certificates, including the Business Analytics Certificate and the Six-Sigma Black Belt Certificate, which can help measure, analyze, improve and control key processes that influence customer satisfaction and productivity growth.

The curriculum comprises the following three components: Supply chain courses and electives, SAP workshops, and Practical work experience.

Master of Science in Positive Organization Development and Change (MPOD)
The   MPOD  D is a  40-credit, 18-month program delivered in five, week-long residencies and one 10-day international study tour.  The program's objectives are to build students' abilities in strategic-level change management and deepen their knowledge of leading-edge theory and practice in appreciative inquiry, strength-based human resource development, and positive organizational change research.

Master of Science in Positive Organization Development & Change-India (MPOD-India)
The MPOD-India is 36 credit hours delivered over five one-week residencies on the Xavier School of Management campus or in select major cities in India, and one two-week residency on the Case Western Reserve University campus in Cleveland, Ohio. This program can be completed in 16 months.

Master of Business Analytics and Intelligence (MBAI)
Qualifying as a STEM degree, Weatherhead School of Management’s Master of Business Analytics and Intelligence bridges analytics and technology with business and leadership skills to meet market trends through forward-thinking curriculum. Our full-time lockstep program is designed to advance your skills to drive key business decisions and solutions within 16 months (Fall, Spring, Fall).  

The 36-credit-hour curriculum includes three interlocking models including the business core, the analytics core and the applied business analytics courses. Through a range of open source and commercial statistical software, you’ll prepare to excel in analyst positions across industries.

Master of Finance (MFIN)
The Master of Finance degree is a full-time program and consists of a curriculum of 30 credit hours of work, including 12 credit hours each of foundation classes, core classes and electives, and can be completed within 9 months.  Students can stay longer in the program (up to two years or 3 or 4 semesters) by completing additional 9 credits towards a departmental certification in one of five different elective paths in Corporate Financial Analytics Specialization (STEM Eligible), Corporate Finance Specialization, Risk Management Analytics Specialization (STEM Eligible), Financial Big Data Analytics Specialization (STEM Eligible), or FinTech Specialization (STEM Eligible).

The program prepares students for professional designation exams, such as the Chartered Financial Analysts, Certified Financial Planners, or the Financial Risk Management.

PhD Programs
The Weatherhead School of Management offers PhD degrees in disciplines such as information systems and organizational behavior. In 2010, the Financial Times ranked the school's doctoral programs 13th in the world.

Doctor of Management (DM) and PhD in Management
The Doctor of Management is a 54-credit-hour, three-year lock-step program for people intending a business, rather an academic, career, and is based on the expectation that the practitioner-scholar will develop the ability to think critically about problems confronting an organization. The D.M. degree was pioneered at Case Western Reserve.

The PhD in Management prepares interdisciplinary scholar-practitioners for academic careers.  Candidates may specialize in one of three areas: Accountancy, Designing Sustainable Systems and Design & Innovation.

PhD in Management - Accountancy
The PhD in Accountancy program is structured and a student study plan is developed to support quality research and effective teaching based upon knowledge and skill levels appropriate to a student's goals. Doctoral students work with faculty whose research investigates matters of importance to academics, practitioners, and policy makers, . The program is designed to take four years including dissertation.

PhD in Management - Designing Sustainable Systems
The Designing Sustainable Systems track is  an extension of the Doctor in Management program. This track represents a new model of doctoral education in management. It takes a broader, evidence-based approach to management issues.

PhD in Management - Design & Innovation
The PhD in management consists of coursework in three areas and a dissertation.   There are two specializations within the Design & Innovation doctoral program: Marketing and Information Systems. The program generally takes four to five years to complete.

PhD in Organizational Behavior
Weatherhead's PhD in Organizational Behavior is designed for full-time, year-round engagement. The program  is generally completed in four to five years.

Executive education
The Weatherhead School has offered executive education for over 30 years. The Weatherhead Executive Education program offers teaching in emotional intelligence, organizational development, health care management, entrepreneurship, innovation, women’s leadership and social impact management.

Executive Doctor of Management (EDM)
The Executive Doctor of Management (EDM) Program comprises 54 credit hours organized into interdependent areas of study. The  program's classes are offered at one 4-day and five 2-day residencies each semester.

Faculty at the Weatherhead school also advise doctoral students in accounting, management, operations research, and organizational behavior. (Technically, degrees are conferred by the School of Graduate Studies at Case Western Reserve University.)

People

Faculty
Prominent faculty include David Cooperrider, Fred Collopy, Dick Boland and Richard Buchanan.  Boland and Collopy are widely published leaders in the emerging 'design thinking' trend.  In addition to numerous articles, Collopy and Boland authored the book "Managing as Designing" about the experience of working with Frank Gehry and how this experience helped shape the design thinking trend.  With the help of Richard Buchanan, The Weatherehad School of Management's lead role in the trend was recognized by BusinessWeek in September, 2009 as one of the top 30 Design Thinking programs in the world.  Their 'Manage By Designing' initiative helped launch the Weatherhead Collection and the rest of the school's much-praised rebranding effort that is notable for having pioneered the use of high-design aesthetics instead of the traditionally conservative approach historically taken by business schools.

Alumni
Victor Ciorbea, former Prime Minister of Romania, specialized in management in 1992.
Subir Gokarn, Deputy Governor of Reserve Bank of India, received his Ph.D. in Economics in 1989.
Kerstin Günther, Senior Vice President at Deutsche Telekom and chair of its subsidiary, Magyar Telekom, earned an MBA in finance in 1999.
Michael McCaskey, Chairman of the Board of the Chicago Bears, awarded a Ph.D. in Organizational Behavior in 1971.
Edward C. Prescott, 2004 Nobel Laureate in Economics, received his MS in operations research in 1964.
Hayagreeva Rao, Atholl McBean Professor of Organizational Behavior and Human Resource, Stanford Graduate School of Business, Ph.D. 1989
Donald E. Washkewicz, former Chairman of the Board and Chief Executive Officer of Parker Hannifin Corporation, received an MBA in 1979.
Mark Weinberger, Global Chairman & CEO of EY (formerly Ernst & Young), received an MBA and a JD in 1987.
Milton A. Wolf, former U.S. ambassador to Austria, earned his Ph.D. in Economics in 1993.

May 2003 shooting and hostage crisis

On May 9, 2003, a gunman entered the school and went on a shooting spree, killing one student, Norman Wallace, and wounding a professor and a Ph.D. student. The suspect was later identified as 62-year-old Biswanath Halder, a 1999 alumnus and native of Calcutta, India. He held off police and SWAT officers for over seven hours, while approximately 100 people hid in offices and closets until they were rescued by police. Halder was ultimately apprehended by a SWAT team in a fifth floor classroom closet. He was convicted on multiple counts and sentenced to life in prison. An appeal in 2008 was denied.

See also
List of United States business school rankings
List of business schools in the United States

References

External links

Images of the Peter B. Lewis Building
Images of the interior of the building

Business schools in Ohio
Case Western Reserve University
1952 establishments in Ohio